The 2. deild kvenna is the third tier women's football league in Iceland. The league was founded in 2017. It featured 12 teams as of 2022 and the top two qualify for a spot in the 1. deild kvenna.

Past winners 
Promoted teams shown in green

By club

See also 

 2. deild karla (men's football league)

References

External links 

 Standings on ksi.is

women
Summer association football leagues
Women's football in Iceland
Women's sports leagues in Iceland
Professional sports leagues in Iceland